The 2010–11 SIJHL season was the 10th season of the Superior International Junior Hockey League (SIJHL). The six teams of the SIJHL played 56-game schedules.

Come February, the top teams of the league played down for the Bill Salonen Cup, the SIJHL championship.  The winner of the Bill Salonen Cup will compete in the Central Canadian Junior "A" championship, the Dudley Hewitt Cup.  If successful against the winners of the Ontario Junior Hockey League and Northern Ontario Junior Hockey League, the champion would then move on to play in the Canadian Junior Hockey League championship, the 2011 Royal Bank Cup.

Changes 
Thunder Bay Wolverines leave league.
Duluth Clydesdales join the league.
Wisconsin Wilderness join league from Minnesota Junior Hockey League.
Fort William North Stars change ownership in October, renamed Thunder Bay North Stars.

Current Standings 
Note: GP = Games played; W = Wins; L = Losses; OTL = Overtime losses; SL = Shootout losses; GF = Goals for; GA = Goals against; PTS = Points; x = clinched playoff berth; y = clinched division title; z = clinched conference title

Teams listed on the official league website.

Standings listed on official league website.

2010-11 Bill Salonen Cup Playoffs

Super Series
Winner gets choice of opponent in semi-finals. A team gets a point for winning the first two-game-aggregate in games one and two, and another point for games three and four.  If tied 1-1 after four games, the series goes to sudden death shootout.

Playoff results are listed on the official league website.

Dudley Hewitt Cup Championship
Hosted by the Huntsville Otters in Huntsville, Ontario.  The Wisconsin Wilderness finished in fourth place.

Round Robin
Wellington Dukes (OJHL) 7 - Wisconsin Wilderness 2
Huntsville Otters (OJHL) 4 - Wisconsin Wilderness 3
Soo Eagles (NOJHL) 2 - Wisconsin Wilderness 1 in quadruple overtime

Scoring leaders 
Note: GP = Games played; G = Goals; A = Assists; Pts = Points; PIM = Penalty minutes

Leading goaltenders 
Note: GP = Games played; Mins = Minutes played; W = Wins; L = Losses: OTL = Overtime losses; SL = Shootout losses; GA = Goals Allowed; SO = Shutouts; GAA = Goals against average

Awards
Top Defenceman: Jon Mitchell (Dryden Ice Dogs)
Most Sportsmanlike Player: Tyler Stevenson (Fort Frances Lakers)
Most Improved Player: Same Dubinsky (Thunder Bay North Stars)
Rookie of the Year: Austin Adduono (Wisconsin Wilderness)
Best Defensive Forward: Blake Boaz (Fort Frances Lakers)
Top Goaltender: John McLean (Wisconsin Wilderness)
Coach of the Year: Wayne Strachan (Fort Frances Lakers)
Player of the Year: Jon Mitchell (Dryden Ice Dogs)
Top Scorer: Austin Adduono (Wisconsin Wilderness)
Scholastic Award: Morgan McNeill (Fort Frances Lakers)
Executive of the Year: Rod Aldoff (Wisconsin Wilderness)
Playoffs Most Valuable Player: John McLean (Wisconsin Wilderness)

See also 
 2011 Royal Bank Cup
 Dudley Hewitt Cup

References

External links 
 Official website of the Superior International Junior Hockey League
 Official website of the Canadian Junior Hockey League

Superior International Junior Hockey League seasons
SIJHL